The 2008–09 UEFA Champions League was the 54th edition of Europe's premier club football tournament and the 17th edition under the current UEFA Champions League format. The final was played at the Stadio Olimpico in Rome on 27 May 2009. It was the eighth time the European Cup final has been held in Italy and the fourth time it has been held at the Stadio Olimpico. The final was contested by the defending champions, Manchester United, and Barcelona, who had last won the tournament in 2006. Barcelona won the match 2–0, with goals from Samuel Eto'o and Lionel Messi, securing The Treble in the process. In addition, both UEFA Cup finalists, Werder Bremen and Shakhtar Donetsk featured in the Champions League group stage.

Anorthosis of Cyprus and BATE Borisov of Belarus were the first teams from their respective countries to qualify for the group stage. Romanian side CFR Cluj and Russian champions Zenit Saint Petersburg also made their Champions League debuts.

Association team allocation
A total of 76 teams from 52 UEFA associations (Liechtenstein organises no domestic league competition) participated in the 2008–09 Champions League. Countries are allocated places according to the 2007 UEFA league co-efficient ranking.

Below is the qualification scheme for the 2008–09 Champions League:
Associations 1–3 each have four teams qualify.
Associations 4–6 each have three teams qualify.
Associations 7–15 each have two teams qualify.
Associations 16–53 (except Liechtenstein) each have one team qualify.

Association ranking
For the 2008–09 UEFA Champions League, the associations are allocated places according to their 2007 UEFA country coefficients, which takes into account their performance in European competitions from 2002–03 to 2006–07.

Distribution
Since the title holders (Manchester United) qualified for the Champions League group stage through their domestic league, the group stage spot reserved for the title holders is vacated, and the following changes to the default access list are made:
The champions of association 10 (Scotland) are promoted from the third qualifying round to the group stage.
The champions of association 16 (Bulgaria) are promoted from the second qualifying round to the third qualifying round.
The champions of associations 23 (Poland) and 24 (Hungary) are promoted from the first qualifying round to the second qualifying round.

Teams
League positions of the previous season shown in parentheses (TH: Title holders).

Notes

Round and draw dates

Qualifying rounds

First qualifying round
The draw for the first and second qualifying rounds was held on 1 July 2008 in Nyon, Switzerland. The first leg matches were held on 15 July and 16 July, while the second legs were played on 22 July and 23 July 2008.

|}

In the draw for the first qualifying round, teams were divided into two pots, on the basis of UEFA coefficients. The lower pot contained the 14 teams from associations 40–53: none of these teams had a team ranking.

Two of the 14 ties were won by the lower ranked team: Inter Baku (Azerbaijan, country rank 42) beat Rabotnički (Macedonia, 36); and BATE Borisov (Belarus, 40) beat Valur (Iceland, 37).

Of the 28 teams in the first qualifying round, two survived as far as the group stage: Anorthosis and BATE Borisov. Each then finished in fourth place.

Second qualifying round
The first leg matches were played on 29 July and 30 July, while the second legs were played on 5 August and 6 August 2008.

|}

In the draw for the second qualifying round, teams were divided into two pots, on the basis of UEFA coefficients. The higher pot contained teams ranked 166 or higher: so each tie contained exactly one team ranked in the top 166.

Three of the 14 ties were won by the lower ranked team: Kaunas (unranked, coefficient 2.640) beat Rangers (ranked 24, coefficient 66.013); BATE Borisov (unranked, 1.760) beat Anderlecht (56, 41.810); and Anorthosis (ranked 193) beat Rapid Wien (ranked 166).

Of the 28 teams in the second qualifying round, Panathinaikos were the only one to qualify for the knockout phase of the competition.

Third qualifying round
The draw for the third qualifying round took place on 1 August 2008 in Nyon, Switzerland. The first leg matches were played on 12 August and 13 August, while the second leg matches took place on 26 August and 27 August. The losing team of each match are being seeded into the 2008–09 UEFA Cup first round; while the winning teams advance into the UEFA Champions League 2008–09 group stage.

|}

In the draw for the third qualifying round, teams were divided into two pots, on the basis of UEFA coefficients. The higher pot contained teams ranked 61 or higher. However, the draw was held before the second qualifying round was played, which meant that Kaunas and BATE Borisov effectively moved into the higher pot, replacing the teams they eliminated.

Four of the 16 ties were won by the lower ranked team: Anorthosis (ranked 193) beat Olympiacos (ranked 44); BATE Borisov (unranked, coefficient 1.760) beat Levski Sofia (ranked 80, coefficient 32.644); Atlético Madrid (ranked 67) beat Schalke 04 (ranked 22) and Dynamo Kyiv (ranked 74) beat Spartak Moscow (ranked 61).

Group stage

The draw for the group stage took place on 28 August 2008 at the Grimaldi Forum, Monaco, prior to the 2008 UEFA Super Cup the following day.

The top two teams in each group advanced to the knockout phase, and the third-placed teams entered the round of 32 of the UEFA Cup. Based on paragraph 6.05 in the UEFA regulations for the current season, if two or more teams are equal on points on completion of the group matches, the following criteria are applied to determine the rankings:
higher number of points obtained in the group matches played among the teams in question;
superior goal difference from the group matches played among the teams in question;
higher number of goals scored away from home in the group matches played among the teams in question;
superior goal difference from all group matches played;
higher number of goals scored in all group matches played;
higher number of coefficient points accumulated by the club in question, as well as its association, over the previous five seasons.

Zenit St. Petersburg, BATE Borisov, CFR Cluj and Anorthosis each made their debut appearance in the group stage.

Group A

Group B

Group C

Group D

Group E

Group F

Group G

Group H

Knockout phase

From the first knockout round through to the semi-finals, clubs play two matches against each other on a home and away basis with the same rules as the qualifying rounds applied. In the last 16, group winners play runners-up other than teams from their own pool or nation. For the draw of the quarter-finals and semi-finals clubs are seeded based on the results in the group stage and round of 16 of the current season (eight matches).

The draw for the first knockout round was held on 19 December 2008 in Nyon, Switzerland. The draw was conducted by UEFA General Secretary David Taylor, Giorgio Marchetti, UEFA's director of professional football and Bruno Conti, the ambassador for the final in Rome.

The draws for the quarter-finals and semi-finals were both held on 20 March 2009 in Nyon, Switzerland. The draw was conducted by David Taylor and Bruno Conti. Unlike the first knockout round, teams from the same group or country may be drawn together from the quarter-finals onwards.

Bracket

Round of 16
The first legs of the first knockout round were played on 24 and 25 February 2009, and the second legs were played on 10 and 11 March.

Bayern Munich defeated Sporting CP by 12–1 on aggregate in the first knockout round; the biggest two-leg win in Champions League era.

Manchester United's 2–0 victory against Internazionale in the first knockout round was their 21st consecutive undefeated match, a record surpassing Ajax's 20 undefeated matches, set between 1985–86 and 1995–96. The record was extended to 25 matches, ending with a 2–0 defeat to Barcelona in the final.

|}

Quarter-finals
The first leg matches were played on 7 April and 8 April, with the second leg matches being played on 14 April and 15 April 2009. Due to the 20th anniversary of Hillsborough Disaster, Liverpool were granted their request that their return leg not be played on 15 April; the match was played on 14 April.

Porto's 1–0 loss to Manchester United in the second leg of the quarter-finals was the club's first ever home defeat to English opposition.

|}

Semi-finals
The first leg matches were played on 28 April and 29 April, while the second leg matches were played on 5 May and 6 May 2009. As in 2007–08, the semi-final teams consisted of three Premier League sides and Barcelona. This was the third consecutive season in which three of the four semi-final teams were English.

Manchester United were the first defending champions to reach the semi-finals since the introduction of the first knockout round in the 2003–04 season.

Chelsea were knocked out by Barcelona after a highly controversial performance by referee Tom Henning Øvrebø, while Arsenal's 3–1 loss to Manchester United in the second leg of the semi-finals was the club's first defeat at the Emirates Stadium in a European competition.

|}

Final

The 2009 UEFA Champions League Final was played at 20:45 CEST on 27 May 2009 at the Stadio Olimpico in Rome, Italy. Barcelona won the match 2–0, with goals from Samuel Eto'o and Lionel Messi. Barcelona's victory also meant that they became the first Spanish team to win the Treble. Manchester United were the first defending champions to reach the final of the competition since Juventus in 1997, but they failed to become the first club to defend the European Cup since Milan in 1990.

Statistics
Statistics exclude qualifying rounds.

Top goalscorers

Source: Top Scorers - Final - Wednesday 27 May 2009 (after match)

Top assists

Source:

See also
 2008–09 UEFA Cup
 2008 UEFA Intertoto Cup
 2009 UEFA Super Cup
 2009 FIFA Club World Cup
 2008–09 UEFA Women's Cup

Footnotes

A.  Match was played in Dublin.
B.  Order of legs reversed

References

External links

 2008–09 All matches – season at UEFA website
 All scorers 2008–09 UEFA Champions League (excluding qualifying round) according to protocols UEFA + all scorers qualifying round
 2008/09 UEFA Champions League - results and line-ups (archive)
 2008-09 UEFA Champions League dates

 
1
2008-09